The Missouri Valley Football Conference (MVFC), formerly the Gateway Football Conference, is a collegiate athletic conference which operates in the Midwestern United States. It participates in the NCAA's Division I Football Championship Subdivision (FCS) as a football-only conference.

History

The Missouri Valley Football Conference has a complex history that involves three other conferences:

 Missouri Valley Conference (MVC): A long-established conference, in existence since 1907, that sponsored football until 1985. In its last years as a football conference, it was a hybrid league that included teams in NCAA Divisions I-A (today's FBS) and I-AA (now FCS).
 Gateway Collegiate Athletic Conference (Gateway): A women's sports conference founded in 1982 by MVC member schools.
 Association of Mid-Continent Universities (AMCU): An all-sports conference, also founded in 1982, that sponsored football at the I-AA level through the 1984 season. The AMCU had absorbed the Mid-Continent Athletic Association, a football-only league founded in 1978. (After dropping football, the AMCU later became the Mid-Continent Conference, and is now The Summit League.)

In 1985, the MVC stopped sponsoring football. At that time, the two remaining I-AA members from the MVC (Illinois State and Southern Illinois) joined Eastern Illinois, Northern Iowa, Southwest Missouri State, and Western Illinois from the AMCU and together became a football conference under the Gateway's auspices. Indiana State, which had left MVC football after the 1981 season to become a Division I-AA independent while remaining a full MVC member, would join the next year.

In 1992, when the Gateway Collegiate Athletic Conference merged with the MVC, the football conference kept the Gateway charter, with a minor name change to Gateway Football Conference. After Eastern Illinois joined the Ohio Valley Conference for football in 1995, Youngstown State joined in 1997 and was followed by Western Kentucky University in 2001. Southwest Missouri State changed its name to Missouri State in 2005.

Western Kentucky moved to the Division I Football Bowl Subdivision (FBS; formerly Division I-A) after the 2006 season, leaving the GFC with seven members for the 2007 season. Great West Football Conference members North Dakota State and South Dakota State were invited to join the conference beginning with the 2008 season. Subsequently, the Gateway Football Conference changed its name to the Missouri Valley Football Conference in June 2008.  This change aligned the conference with the Missouri Valley Conference, a conference in which five of the nine Missouri Valley Football schools were (and still are) all-sports members.  The conferences continue to share the "Missouri Valley" name, and space in the same building in St. Louis, but remain separate administratively.

The University of South Dakota joined as the 10th member in 2012.  The University of North Dakota joined as the 11th member in 2020, bringing back the yearly rivalries among North Dakota, North Dakota State, South Dakota and South Dakota State which had existed under the Division 2 North Central Conference that NDSU and SDSU left in 2004–05. 

The most recent change to the MVFC membership was announced on April 4, 2022. Murray State University, which had previously been announced as a new MVC member effective in July 2022, will join the MVFC in 2023.

Member schools

Current members

Former members

Membership timeline

Conference champions

11 different teams have won MVFC championships. The most recent champion is South Dakota State. The school with the most championships is Northern Iowa (10).

NCAA Football Championship Subdivision national championships

♯ Now a member of the Football Bowl Subdivision (FBS).

Records

Overall winning streaks

† FCS Record

Consecutive conference wins

North Dakota State, 19 (2017–2020)
North Dakota State, 18 (2012–2014)

Facilities

See also
List of American collegiate athletic stadiums and arenas

References

External links

 

 
Sports organizations established in 1985
Articles which contain graphical timelines
1985 establishments in the United States